Yanhamu, also Yenhamu, and Enhamu, was an Egyptian commissioner of the 1350-1335 BC Amarna letters correspondence.

Yanhamu is referenced in 16 of the 60–letter "Rib-Hadda of Gubla"-(Byblos) sub-corpus, and also 12 additional letters.

Letters referencing commissioner Yanhamu

Milkilu's EA 270, "Extortion"
Letter no. 4 of 5 to Pharaoh, from "Milkilu of Gazru"-(modern Gezer):

Milkilu's EA 271, "The Power of the 'Apiru"
Milkilu letter no. 5 of 5 to Pharaoh:

Referenced Amarna letters to Yanhamu
The largest sub-corpus of Amarna letters is from the Rib-Haddi corpus: namely "Rib-Hadda of Gubla"-(Byblos). 16 of Rib-Haddi's letters reference Yanhamu, (EA for 'el Amarna').

Letters EA 82-132(16)the Rib-Hadda/Byblos letters-(w/out-EA 98)
EA 82—
EA 85—
EA 86—
EA 98—
EA 102—
EA 105—
EA 106—
EA 109—
EA 116—
EA 117—
EA 118—
EA 127—
EA 131—
EA 132—See: Pahura

Other letters:
EA 98—See: Yapa-Hadda
----
EA 171—See: Pawura
EA 215—
EA 256—
EA 270—Milkilu no. 4 of 5 to pharaoh.
EA 271—Milkilu no. 5 of 5 to pharaoh.
EA 283—See: Šuwardata
EA 284—
EA 285—
EA 286—
EA 289—See: Pawura
EA 286—See: Yabitiri
EA 366—See: Šuwardata

See also
Milkilu
Rib-Hadda of Gubla/Byblos
Amarna letters
Text corpus

References
Moran, William L. The Amarna Letters. Johns Hopkins University Press, 1987, 1992. (softcover)

Amarna letters officials